Fossil Bight is a shallow recession in the north coast of Seymour Island,  north-northeast of Cape Lamas. The feature was called "Fossil Bay" or "Bahia Fosiles" by United States Antarctic Research Program and Argentine researchers because of fossils found here in 1982. The generic term bight is now considered appropriate to this feature.

References 

Bays of the James Ross Island group
Bights (geography)